The Gta language (also Gata or Gataʔ), also known as Gta Asa, Didei or Didayi, is an Austroasiatic language spoken by the Didayi people of southernmost Odisha in India. It is notable for its sesquisyllabic phonology and vigesimal numeral system.

Demographics
Gta is spoken by 3,000 people primarily in Malkangiri district, Odisha as well as adjoining areas of Koraput district. According to Anderson (2008), it is spoken by less than 4,500 people.

Ethnologue reports the following locations:
Odisha (47 villages): Kudumulgumma block and Chitrakonda block of Koraput district and Malkangiri district, south of Bondo Hills; some in Khairput block
East Godavari district, Andhra Pradesh

Classification and dialects
The Gta language belongs to the South Munda subgroup of the Munda branch of the Austroasiatic language family. Within South Munda, Gta is generally considered to be the first branch off a node that also subsumes the Remo and Gutob languages; this subgroup of South Munda is known as Gutob–Remo–Gataq. It is phonologically and morphologically divergent within that branch.

Gta has two main varieties, namely Plains Gta and Hill Gta.

Phonology 
Gta has the 5 canonical vowels /a, e, i, o, u/, and sometimes a sixth vowel /æ/. To this can be added several nasalized counterparts: /ã, õ, ũ/ and sometimes /ĩ/. Gta has the following consonants:

Grammar

Nouns
Nouns in Gtaʔ are primarily marked for case, number and possession.

Nouns also have two forms, one a free full form, the other a bound short form. These latter occur only when the noun is compounded with another noun or a verb for derivational purposes, and are hence labeled "combining forms". The combining form usually involves removing an affix or shortening the noun in some way.

Echo formation
Gtaʔ is also notable for its use of echo words. There are four broad categories of echo forms:
 a-forms, indicating gross variety;
 i-forms, indicating diminutive or tender variety;
 u/a-forms, indicating variety different from a related category;
 partially changed forms, indicating inferior variety: a-forms, indicating grossness; and i-forms, indicating tenderness.

The phonological rules for deriving one type of echo word are as follows:
 Echo-words are formed by changing only the vowels of the base word.
 The echo-word must differ from the base word. The vowel of univocalic base words is reflected as either /a/ or /i/ in the echo-word. For base-word /u, e, o/ the vowel /a/ is preferred, while for base word /ɛ/ the vowel /i/ is preferred.
 The vowels of disyllabic base words are reflected in the echo-word as follows: 
 Both vowels are reflected as either /a/ or /i/; or 
 Only one of the base-word vowels is reflected as /a/ or /i/ while the other is reflected unchanged; or 
 The first vowel (V1) changes to /u/ while the second (V2) changes to /a/.
 In the case of trisyllabic base words, one, two or all three of the vowels (in adjacent syllables) are reflected as either /a/ or /i/.
 The echo-forms of compound words, irrespective of their vocalic structure, are derived as follows: 
 In the case of compound verbs consisting of two verb stems, one or both stems undergo change, depending on their relationship with each other; 
 Nominal combining forms occurring with verb stems change independently; those attached to noun stems change only at par with the main stem. 
 In verbal constructions incorporating a prefix, both the prefix and the stem change as a unit.

Combining forms of nouns occurring with verb stems can be echoed independently of the verb stems; those occurring with noun stems either remain intact or change at par with the main stems.

Numeral system
Gta' numeral system is vigesimal.

Neighboring languages
Gtaʔ echo-formation shows some striking similarities with echo-formation in neighboring Munda languages such as Remo and Gorum as well as in the Desia dialect of Oriya spoken in the Koraput Munda region. The most conspicuous feature they have in common with Gtaʔ is that echo-words in all three of these languages are also derived from base words by changes in the vowels alone.

References

Further reading
Anderson, Gregory D.S. (n.d.). Gtaʔ (Didey) Language – Munda Languages Project – Living Tongues Institute for Endangered Languages .
Anderson, Gregory D.S. 2001. "A new classification of South Munda: Evidence from comparative verb morphology". Indian Linguistics 62.1: 21–36.
Anderson, Gregory D.S. 2008. "Gtaʔ." In: Gregory D.S. Anderson (ed.), The Munda Languages. London / New York. [Routledge Language Family Series]. 682–763.
Bauer, Christian. 1993. Review of: Robert Parkin: A guide to Austroasiatic speakers and their languages. (Oceanic Linguistics, Special Publication, no. 23.) ix, 198, [xv] pp. Honolulu: University of Hawaii Press, 1991. In: Bulletin of the School of Oriental and African Studies, vol. 56, issue 1 (February 1993), pp. 193–194.
DeArmond, R. (1976). Proto-Gutob-Remo-Gtaq Stressed Monosyllabic Vowels and Initial Consonants. Austroasiatic Studies Part I, 13, 213–227. Munda. (n.d.). Retrieved February 15, 2015
Odden, D. (1987). "Arguments against the Vowel Plane" in Gtaʔ Linguistic Inquiry, 18(3), 523–529.
Parkin, R. (1988). "Marriage, Behaviour and Generation among the Munda of Eastern India". Zeitschrift für Ethnologie, 113(1), 69–80.
Sidwell, P., & Jenny, M. (2014). The Handbook of Austroasiatic Languages (2 vols). Leiden: Brill.
Stampe, D. (1965). "Recent Work in Munda Linguistics I". International Journal of American Linguistics, 31(4), 332–341.
Zide, N. (1976). "A Note on Gtaʔ Echo Forms", in P. Jenner, L. Thompson, and S. Starosta, eds., Austroasiatic Studies, University of Hawaii Press, Honolulu.

External links
 Online Gtaʔ Dictionary (Chatterji)
 Online Gtaʔ Dictionary (Mahapatra)
 Toshiki Osada's Munda Site (with information on Gta, Gutob, Ho, Mundari)
 Gta' Audio Recording
 Gta'

Languages of India
Munda languages